Lonbar may refer to:
 Lonbar, Ardabil
 Lonbar, Sistan and Baluchestan